Gabriele Angella (born 28 April 1989) is an Italian professional footballer who plays as a defender for Serie B club Perugia.

Club career
Angella began his career at Empoli in 2006 and was promoted to the first team in 2008, he played his first Serie B match on 13 September 2008, a 0–0 draw with AlbinoLeffe.

On 31 August 2010, Udinese signed him along with Diego Fabbrini in a co-ownership deal for €3 million.  As part of the deal, Ricardo Chará and Flavio Lazzari joined Empoli, also in co-ownership deal for a small fee.  He was loaned out to Siena for the 2011–2012 season and moved on loan to Reggina in late January 2012. In June 2013 Angella and Daniele Mori were signed outright for €350,000 each.

In July 2013, Angella joined Watford permanently on a five-year deal from Udinese, making his debut away to Birmingham City on 3 August 2013. Having opened his Watford account away to Bristol Rovers on 6 August 2013, Angella scored twice in Watford's 6–1 win over Bournemouth on 10 August 2013. On 30 January 2014, Angella scored a brace in an eventual 4–2 defeat to Nottingham Forest.

On 1 September 2015, he joined Queens Park Rangers on a season long loan from Watford. He scored his first goal for QPR in a 2–0 win over Derby County on 8 March 2016.

On 1 July 2016, Angella left Watford to rejoin Udinese on a four-year contract.

International career
He made his Italy U-21 debut on 4 September 2009, starting in a 1–2 defeat against Wales in Swansea.

Career statistics

References

External links
Profile at FIGC 
Profile at Empoli 
Profile at Football.it 

1989 births
Living people
Footballers from Florence
Association football defenders
Italian footballers
Italian expatriate footballers
Italy under-21 international footballers
Serie A players
Serie B players
English Football League players
Belgian Pro League players
Empoli F.C. players
Udinese Calcio players
A.C.N. Siena 1904 players
Reggina 1914 players
Watford F.C. players
Queens Park Rangers F.C. players
R. Charleroi S.C. players
A.C. Perugia Calcio players
Expatriate footballers in England
Expatriate footballers in Belgium